is a Japanese manga series written and illustrated by Minetaro Mochizuki. It was published by Kodansha in Weekly Young Magazine from 1994 to 1999 and was collected in ten tankōbon volumes. It was licensed in English by Kodansha USA in 2018.

The series was adapted as a live-action film written and directed by Jôji Iida, released in Japan in August 2003. It starred Satoshi Tsumabuki and Sayaka Kanda.

In 1997, Dragon Head won the 21st Kodansha Manga Award for the general category.

Plot

Arc 1: Escape from the tunnels
Teru Aoki (青木 輝), the main protagonist, is riding a train to Tokyo after a school trip. Just before his train enters a tunnel, Teru briefly sees something in the distance, though he doesn't understand what he saw. Soon after entering the tunnel, a powerful earthquake derails the train and blocks both sides of the tunnel with rubble. Knocked unconscious during the derailment, Teru reawakens to find, much to his horror, that all of his teachers and classmates have died in the crash. Wandering the wrecked wagons of the train, he finds Nobuo Takahashi (高橋 のぶお), a highly unnerved boy who apparently was being bullied at school, and Ako Seto (瀬戸 憧子), who is unconscious and wounded.

Teru treats Ako, who wakes up after several days. While they find temporary shelter in the dining wagon, Nobuo gives in to fear and declares that "something" is lurking in the tunnel with them. Nobuo's mental state deteriorates to the point where he claims the wrecked train for himself, forcing Teru and Ako to build a makeshift shelter outside in the tunnel. After days pass with no sign of rescue, Teru tries to find an escape route and ventures into a partially collapsed ventilation shaft. Meanwhile, Nobuo becomes deranged, paints his body as if he was a primitive savage, and mutilates the corpse of a teacher thinking he's still alive. He kidnaps Ako and almost rapes her, but she manages to escape.

In the ventilation shafts, Teru is suddenly hit by a powerful stream of contaminated water, which saves him from a previous cave-in that almost buries him alive, and the shaft collapses while the tunnel is rocked by more powerful tremors. In the chaos, amidst falling rocks and choking steam, Teru notices Ako being chased by a crazed Nobuo and comes to the girl's rescue. Despite getting stabbed in the shoulder, Teru manages to overcome and defeat Nobuo before almost killing him with a rock. He and Ako soon escape after the tunnel starts collapsing and, incredibly, lava begins flowing in it. They succeed in escaping through the ventilation shafts, but Nobuo is left behind in the darkness and is never seen again.

Arc 2: Searching for allies
Teru and Ako surface in the ruins of a wastewater treatment plant. They find that the landscape is covered by a thick layer of dense ash, and the sky is filled with clouds thick enough to almost blot out sunlight. A functioning television reveals to them that society has collapsed and that most cities have been taken over by looters. Ako follows someone to a hospital where they are helped by a group of teenage survivors. Ako and Teru initially follow this group to Tokyo, but decide to leave after witnessing them wounding themselves and dancing amidst dead cattle.

During the trek they are almost killed by a sudden mudslide, and soon after they see a squadron of military helicopters in the sky above them. Following the direction of the helicopters, they arrive to a deserted town. Exploring it, Teru gets separated from Ako after he notices a helicopter and, thinking they can be rescued, goes investigating. Aboard the helicopter are Captain Nimura (仁村), pilot Iwada (岩田), and crewmen Yamazaki (山崎) and Ōike (大池). While Iwada seems to be a voice of reason, Nimura is an unprofessional loose cannon and chases away Teru when he begs them for help. Meanwhile, Ako encounters Yamazaki, who left the rest of the crew in search of fuel.

Seeing Yamazaki return wounded and now knowing there's a girl in town, Nimura and Ōike grab their guns and start searching for her. The stress of the situation, the urge to defend Ako and the hatred for the soldiers briefly cause Teru to "give in to the darkness" as Nobuo did, preparing a Molotov cocktail in hiding. After Nimura and Ōike separate in their search, the latter finds Teru in a crazed state. He tries to reason with him, before noticing the petrol bomb in his hand and trying to disarm him. Teru's grip slips and the petrol bomb crashes at Ōike's feet, burning him to death. Teru then confronts Nimura, though the situation is cut short by a huge conflagration which starts burning down the town. Ako fends off Yamazaki, grabs hold of his gun and forces him to take her to the helicopter.

The conflagration quickly becomes a powerful firestorm. At the schoolyard where the helicopter landed, Iwada and Ako take off, leaving Yamazaki behind to be burned alive enormous fire tornadoes. Nimura and Teru almost share the same fate if not for Ako's insistence to rescue them. They are saved in the nick of time when Iwada lands the helicopter near them and takes them aboard. The group leaves the town, now completely engulfed in flames.

Arc 3: Izu peninsula
After Teru falls unconscious due to his injuries, the helicopter gets lost in a massive, thick ash cloud. Because it's impossible to fly directly through the cloud without damaging the helicopter's engine, they decide to take a detour through the Izu peninsula. Iwada worries about the lack of fuel, wondering if they even have enough to reach Izu. Before they can gather much, the road starts to collapse into the sea and they have to fly away.

In Izu, they are greeted by a survivor who tells them that a tsunami hit, reaching far inland, and that the main town has been taken over by looters. The survivor, who has medical training, tells them Teru has tetanus, due to the untreated wound inflicted to him by Nobuo. Iwada repairs the helicopter while Ako and Nimura, much to his annoyance, go to the town searching for medicine and fuel. To keep Nimura from doing anything dangerous, he is given weapons but no ammunition, which Ako carries instead, to give him only in emergencies. They are also given radios to remain in contact with Iwada.

As Ako and Nimura camp out for the night, they briefly see lights in the distance. The next day, they find mutilated bodies at a nearby lake as well as a frightened young man and his companion, a seemingly disabled boy with strange scars on his head. Inhabitants from the town appear and attack them in a frenzy. The silent boy gets badly burned on his arm, but incredibly doesn't make a sound, as if completely numb to pain. A policeman shoots and wounds Nimura, and he, Ako, and the scarred boy are brought to the town.

Ako and Nimura find that the town has been barricaded to prevent those inside from escaping. Due to the tsunami, Izu has now become an island separated from mainland Japan. This isolation has left the survivors without food and, due to the dire circumstances, has driven them to go mad and murder their relatives, with plans to stage a mass suicide. However, the sight of Ako makes them even more crazed, wanting to sacrifice her before their kill themselves. Fortunately, Nimura, Ako, and the scarred boy, Kikuchi, manage to escape from the mob, though they can't leave town.

The trio run to a building filled with gasoline, where the mob plans to kill themselves in a makeshift funeral pyre. They manage to reach the town's hospital, though in the process Ako kills some of the townspeople to defend herself. Ako and Nimura briefly barricade themselves, and she finds the much-needed medicine for Teru. As Ako tries to find out an escape route, she notices that Kikuchi has wandered off. When she finds him, he mentions a certain painting believed to be related to the events, and calls himself Dragon Head.

Soon after, the trio are cornered in the hospital by the townspeople. Nimura and Ako fight them off and escape on a motorcycle, while Kikuchi is left alone and beaten by one of the aggressors. However, Kikuchi scares off his attacker when he doesn't die of his injuries, and mocks everyone for the fear they feel. Nimura, on the other hand, explains that he looks out only for himself, but says that he is different from the townspeople — he is afraid to die, unlike them.

Meanwhile, a smaller group of townspeople find the radio in the forest and call Iwada, pretending to have hostages. They lure Iwada to their location and attempt to commandeer his helicopter. He is forced to land, but while they argue over who gets to fly away, he dispatches them with a rocket launcher. He takes off again to the town, but he is wounded when one of the invaders manages to enter the helicopter and shoots one of his ears off with a gunshot. Iwada fends him off and resumes his flight.

Ako and Nimura climb to the top of the pyre building just as the ash cloud moves over the Izu peninsula. Iwada reaches them and they manage to load fuel barrels on the helicopter before leaving. As the town is completely engulfed in the massive cloud, a townsperson ignites the pyre and blows the building up, burning to death with the other survivors. As they fly away, Teru's group sees Kikuchi on the rooftop, on fire and showing no expression, a sight that greatly disturbs Ako.

After the group finds a safe place to land at the home of an anonymous woman, Ako treats Teru. The two agree to stick together and look for their families in Tokyo. Remembering the words from Kikuchi, Ako reaches a nearby building where, reading through some books, manages to link the "painting" he spoke about to Mount Fuji.  Everyone comes with them except for the woman, who warns Teru and Ako not to give in to fear and that fear itself can be faced and conquered.

Arc 4: Discovery
With the helicopter's engine now able to withstand the ash cloud, the group decides to attempt to travel through it. On the other side, they find a darkened wasteland covered by rivers of lava and see the wrecks of Nimura's helicopter squadron. Mount Fuji has vanished, and in its place they find a gigantic crater. They fly inside the hole to see how deep it goes, but ascend when they are overcome by fear. Considering the environmental conditions, the group theorizes that Mount Fuji had either suffered a catastrophic volcanic eruption or had been hit by a meteor.

Flying through the ash cloud again, the group find themselves in a location where the sky is brighter and the ash falling is almost snow-like. They land on top of a shopping mall to search for supplies. The location has already been looted and the structure is dangerously unstable. They leave when a powerful tornado forms nearby and moves in the direction of the mall. In the ensuing chaos, Iwada, Ako, and Nimura manage to take off in the helicopter while the roof of the mall collapses beneath Teru. He survives by hiding in an elevator, where he falls unconscious.

When Teru wakes up, he comes across the wreck of the helicopter and a makeshift grave for Iwada, who died in the crash. Although initially overcome by despair, Teru looks inside the helicopter and finds and a note from Ako, which tells him that she and Nimura are heading for Tokyo on foot. Hopeful to see Ako again, Teru embarks on the long trek to follow them. Along the way, he encounters a wounded man, who incoherently babbles about Tokyo being both Hell and Heaven. In a fit of madness, the man runs away and falls off a cliff. After giving him a hasty burial, Teru resumes his journey and arrives in ruined Tokyo.

Arc 5: Tokyo ruins
Teru wanders through the corpse-littered streets of Tokyo, clinging to the hope of finding other human beings. Distraught and tired, Teru stops near the entrance to the subway, where he briefly hears a voice. Following the source, Teru finds that someone has put radios in the subway tunnels, which all repeat a garbled message. Deeper into the underground, the boy finds a man-made cave that leads him to another station, under which lava is flowing. Terrified, Teru goes even deeper, and finds himself in a massive warehouse where a group of survivors, led by a self-declared scientist, have stockpiled supplies. Many members of his group are covered with self-inflicted wounds, while others are painted and armed like Nobuo.

The scientist explains that the group's supplies are experimental compounds which numb fear. After consuming them for a prolonged period of time, the survivors of his group stopped feeling fear completely and, longing for it again, started wounding themselves. Disturbed by what he sees and hears, Teru leaves the group and makes his way to the surface. Teru finds his now-collapsed apartment building, where he finds another note left by Ako urging him to go to their school. Meanwhile, the scientist's group attacks a patrol of foreign soldiers, and a fleet of ships from another country is seen anchored in what was once Tokyo Bay.

Teru reaches the school meets Ako and Nimura, but Nimura pulls a gun on him and says he is taking Ako for himself. He holds Teru at gunpoint, and Teru opines that without fear — either by being numbed to it, or just never needing it — life is lessened. Unnerved, Nimura declares that he saw the graves where the victims of the disaster were collected, and among whom were Teru's whole family. He then shoots Teru before being subdued by both him and Ako. Teru discharges Nimura's gun in the air and leaves him alive before leaving with Ako. Nimura, alone, is left wondering about himself.

Foreign soldiers storm Tokyo and are attacked by the survivor group. The scientist, now holding a pair of severed heads, says to a soldier that he helped bring about the apocalypse. A document discovered by other soldiers indicates that three nuclear weapons were on Japanese soil, that the governments of Japan and other nations have vanished, and that no one seems to know what exactly caused the catastrophe. During the chaos, a volcano suddenly emerges in what was once central Tokyo. Teru and Ako sit together and watch the volcano, and Teru reflects that the world is what you make of it, and that even with the world in ruins good or evil still both have chances to triumph, leaving a faint glimmer of hope for things to adjust themselves in the future.

Reception
Dragon Head won the 21st Kodansha Manga Award for the general category in 1997. It won the Award for Excellence at the 4th Tezuka Osamu Cultural Prize in 2000.

References

External links
 
 

1995 manga
2003 films
Kodansha manga
Post-apocalyptic anime and manga
Japanese post-apocalyptic films
Seinen manga
Tokyopop titles
Winner of Kodansha Manga Award (General)
Winner of Tezuka Osamu Cultural Prize (Award for Excellence)
2000s Japanese films
2003 science fiction films